Eurysthea is a genus of beetles in the family Cerambycidae, containing the following species:

 Eurysthea antonkozlovi Botero & Santos-Silva, 2017
Eurysthea barsevskisi Botero & Santos-Silva, 2017
Eurysthea caesariata (Martins, 1995)
 Eurysthea cribripennis (Bates, 1885)
 Eurysthea hirca (Berg, 1889)
 Eurysthea hirta (Kirby, 1818)
 Eurysthea ilinizae (Kirsch, 1889)
 Eurysthea koepckei (Franz, 1956)
 Eurysthea lacordairei (Lacordaire, 1869)
 Eurysthea latefasciata (Fonseca-Gessner, 1990)
Eurysthea llinasi Taboada-Verona & Botero, 2018
 Eurysthea magnifica Martins, 1985
 Eurysthea martinsi (Fonseca-Gessner, 1990)
Eurysthea nakagomei Botero, Heffern & Santos-Silva, 2018
Eurysthea nearnsi Botero & Santos-Silva, 2017
 Eurysthea nicolai (Aurivillius, 1908)
Eurysthea nogueirai Botero, Heffern & Santos-Silva, 2018
 Eurysthea obliqua (Audinet-Serville, 1834)
Eurysthea parva Martins & Galileo, 2013
 Eurysthea punctata (Fonseca-Gessner, 1990)
 Eurysthea robertsi (Fonseca-Gessner, 1990)
 Eurysthea rotundicollis (Martins, 1995)
 Eurysthea sordida (Erichson, 1847)
 Eurysthea squamifera (Martins, 1967)
 Eurysthea subandina (Fonseca-Gessner, 1990)
Eurysthea tatianakozlovae Botero & Santos-Silva, 2017
Eurysthea vandenberghei Santos-Silva, Heffern & Botero, 2021

References

Elaphidiini